Josephine Byrnes (born 1966) is an Australian actress best known for her work in television, including a lead role in Brides of Christ for which she won a Logie Award.

Filmography

Film

Television

References

External links

1966 births
20th-century Australian actresses
21st-century Australian actresses
Living people
Logie Award winners